This article displays the squads of the teams that competed in 2017–18 Dutch Basketball League (DBL). BAL and Den Helder Suns played their debut seasons in the DBL.

As of 24 October 2017.

Rules
For the 2017–18 season, league policy was changed and the number of allowed foreign players per team was increased from 4 to 5. Additional was the restriction that a team is not allowed to have five foreign players on the court at the same time.

Import players by nationality

Note

Apollo Amsterdam

Aris Leeuwarden

BAL

Den Helder Suns

Donar

Forward Lease Rotterdam

Landstede

New Heroes

ZZ Leiden

References

Squads